I Spent a Week There the Other Night is an album by the American musician Moe Tucker, released in 1991.

Included on the album is a cover of "Then He Kissed Me", originally by the Crystals, as well as a cover of the Velvet Underground song "I'm Waiting for the Man". I Spent a Week There the Other Night was reissued in 1994.

Production
The album has performances by members of the Velvet Underground, including Lou Reed, Sterling Morrison and John Cale. All four original Velvets play together on "I'm Not", making it their only studio collaboration on original material since 1968. Members of Violent Femmes also contributed to the album. Tucker stuck mostly to rhythm guitar.

Critical reception

The Orlando Sentinel wrote that "the basement minimalism is perfect for her ingenuous songs and flat but expressive vocals." Trouser Press praised "Lazy", writing that, "for a 46-year-old mother of five, 'Lazy' is pure punk perfection."

Track listing 
All songs written and arranged by Maureen Tucker except where noted.

"Fired Up" – 4:01
"That's B.A.D." – 4:58
"Lazy" – 2:28
"S.O.S." – 3:12
"Blue, All the Way to Canada" (Tucker, Jim Turner) – 3:52
"(And) Then He Kissed Me" (Jeff Barry, Ellie Greenwich, Phil Spector) – 2:31
"Too Shy" – 3:35
"Stayin' Put" – 4:23
"Baby, Honey, Sweetie" – 3:18
"I'm Not" – 6:55
"I'm Waiting for the Man" (Lou Reed) – 5:27

Personnel
Maureen Tucker – bass, guitar, percussion, vocals, production, mixing
John Sluggett – drums 
Sonny Vincent – guitar
Daniel Hutchens – guitar 
Sterling Morrison – electric guitar on "Too Shy", 12-string guitar on "Blue, All the Way to Canada"
Victor DeLorenzo – drums
Brian Ritchie – bass
Lou Reed – guitar on "Fired Up" and "I'm Not"
Jim Morris – trumpet
Michelle Saacks – piano
John Cale – synthesizer on "I'm Waiting for the Man", viola on "(And) Then He Kissed Me" and "I'm Not"
Dorothy Dargan - vocals
David Doris - saxophone
Don Fleming - guitar
Arlene Levin - vocals
Martha Morrison - vocals

References

Maureen Tucker albums
1991 albums
Albums produced by Maureen Tucker